The Atherton Tableland skink (Glaphyromorphus mjobergi)  is a species of skink found in Queensland in Australia.

References

Glaphyromorphus
Reptiles described in 1915
Taxa named by Einar Lönnberg
Taxa named by Lars Gabriel Andersson